The Myanmar Ambassador in Beijing is the official representative of the Government in Naypyidaw to the Government of China.

List of representatives

See also
 China–Myanmar relations

References 

 
China
Myanmar